The 2022 Rugby World Cup Sevens European Qualifier was the final qualification event for the 2022 Rugby World Cup Sevens. Four teams qualified from the 12 teams entered. The event was held at the Stadionul Arcul de Triumf in Bucharest. Ireland were strong favourites entering the tournament and qualified for 2022 event, by defeating Georgia 17–12 in their quarter-final matchup.

Teams

 
 
 
  (Q)
  (Q)
 
 
 
  (Q)
 
 
  (Q)

Teams marked with (Q) qualified for 2022 Rugby World Cup Sevens.

Event
All times are in Eastern European Summer Time.

Pool stage

Pool A

Pool B

Pool C

Seeds
The final seeding procedure, to determine the four teams that would play-off, saw 1 v 8, 2 v 7, 3 v 6, and 4 v 5:

Knockout play-offs
Winners of the four matches advance to 2022 Rugby World Cup Sevens.

Notes

References

 
2022
2022 rugby sevens competitions
International rugby union competitions hosted by Romania
Sports competitions in Bucharest
2022 in Romanian sport
Rugby World Cup Sevens